Taylorconcha is a genus of small freshwater snails that have an operculum, aquatic gastropod mollusks in the family Hydrobiidae.

Species
Species within the genus Taylorconcha include:
 Bliss Rapids snail, Taylorconcha serpenticola

References

 ITIS info
 Turgeon, D. D., J. F. Quinn, Jr., A. E. Bogan, E. V. Coan, F. G. Hochberg, W. G. Lyons, et al., 1998, Common and scientific names of aquatic invertebrates from the United States and Canada: Mollusks, 2nd ed., American Fisheries Society Special Publication 26, pp. 526, American Fisheries Society, Bethesda, Maryland, 

 
Hydrobiidae
Taxonomy articles created by Polbot